Martuni District was an administrative unit within the former Nagorno-Karabakh Autonomous Oblast (NKAO) of the Azerbaijan Soviet Socialist Republic.

History 
The administrative centre of the district was the town of Martuni.

The Nagorno-Karabakh Autonomous Oblast was abolished on 26 November 1991. On 13 October 1992, the Martuni district was merged with the Hadrut district to form the Khojavend District.

Following the First Nagorno-Karabakh war, most of the former district came under the control of the self-proclaimed Republic of Artsakh and was incorporated into its Martuni Province, while Azerbaijan retained control of a small eastern part of the district. During the 2020 Nagorno-Karabakh war, Azerbaijan recaptured the southern part of the former district.

Demographics

References

Subdivisions of the Nagorno-Karabakh Autonomous Oblast
History of the Republic of Artsakh